Minkhaung II of Toungoo (1520s–1584) was viceroy of Toungoo (Taungoo) from 1549 to 1551 and from 1552 to 1584 during the reigns of kings Tabinshwehti, Bayinnaung and Nanda of Toungoo Dynasty of Burma (Myanmar). He briefly revolted against his eldest half-brother Bayinnaung from 1550 to 1551 but was pardoned by Bayinnaung. Alongside his brothers Bayinnaung, Minye Sithu, Thado Dhamma Yaza II, Thado Minsaw and his nephew Nanda, he fought in nearly every campaign between 1552 and 1584 that rebuilt, expanded and defended the Toungoo Empire.

Minkhaung II is sometimes referred to as the basis for Taungoo Mingaung, one of the Thirty Seven Nats in the official pantheon of Burmese spirits although the actual basis may have been Minkhaung I of Toungoo.

Early life
He was born Zeya Nanda in the Toungoo Palace precincts to Mingyi Swe and the younger sister of Shin Myo Myat, royal household servants of Crown Prince Tabinshwehti. He had an elder half-sister, Dhamma Dewi, three elder half-brothers, Bayinnaung and Minye Sithu, Thado Dhamma Yaza II and a younger full-brother Thado Minsaw. He was likely born in the late 1520s since his younger brother Thado Minsaw was born in May 1531. He grew up in the palace precincts, and received a military-style education there.

Tabinshwehti era
Zeya Nanda came of age at a time when his native Toungoo was in the process of building the largest polity in Burma since the late 13th century. Although he probably joined his older brothers in Tabinshwehti's later military campaigns in the 1540s, he had not achieved a regimental commander status to be mentioned in the chronicles. His name does not appear in the commander lists down to the last campaigns of Tabinshwehti: Arakan (1545–47) and Siam (1547–1549).

At any rate, the king was apparently impressed by the young man's ability. When viceroy of Toungoo Mingyi Swe died in March 1549, the king named Zeya Nanda successor with the title of Thihathu. Though it was a governorship, as opposed to a viceroyship, the appointment was still an impressive achievement for the young man as he was selected over his older and more experienced brothers Minye Sithu and Thado Dhamma Yaza II both of whom had been commanders since 1540, and over the objections of ministers concerned by handing over the ancestral home of the dynasty to a relatively inexperienced youngster. The ministers actually recommended Bayinnaung but the king rejected, saying that Bayinnaung was already his heir-apparent.

Bayinnaung era

In rebellion
Now styled as Thihathu, he remained Tabinshwehti's favorite. In January/February 1550 (Tabodwe 911 ME), the king entrusted him to administer Pegu (Bago) while he went on a months-long hunting trip and Bayinnaung was on the campaign in the Irrawaddy delta to suppress a rebellion. Three months into his stay at Pegu, he received word that the king had been assassinated. Although Tabinshwehti had chosen Bayinnaung as his successor since 1542, governors and viceroys of major regions all declared themselves king. Thihathu was no exception. He immediately returned to Toungoo and declared himself king with the title of Minkhaung.

But all his other brothers remained loyal to their eldest brother. In September 1550, Bayinnaung's forces (9600 men, 200 horses, 20 elephants, 200 war boats) laid siege to Toungoo.  Minkhaung resisted for four months but finally surrendered on 11 January 1551. Remarkably, Bayinnaung forgave his brother, saying that their father had wanted all the brothers to remain united like the five fingers of the hand.

In Bayinnaung's service
Minkhaung was overcome by Bayinnaung's pardon, and proved to be a loyal brother and an effective military commander for the rest of their lives. He immediately redeemed himself by leading the successful attack on Prome (Pyay) on 30 August 1551. He is said to have led the charge on the city walls, rammed his war elephant through the badly damaged massive wooden doors of the main gate, entered the city.

The following is a list of campaigns he participated in during the reign of Bayinnaung. (He did not participate in Manipur in 1560 or Mohnyin/Mogaung in 1571.)

He was appointed viceroy of Toungoo on 6 June 1552 (Monday, 14th waxing of Waso 914 ME).

He built the Toungoo gate of Pegu (Bago) when the capital was rebuilt between 1565 and 1568. (Each of the twenty gates of the new capital was built by key vassal rulers.) For their loyal service, Thado Dhamma Yaza II, Minkhaung II and Thado Minsaw were all honored by their brother the king on 3 March 1580.

Nanda era
Bayinnaung died on 10 October 1581, and was succeeded by his son Nanda. The new king faced an impossible task of maintaining an empire ruled by autonomous viceroys who were loyal to Bayinnaung, not the kingdom of Toungoo. In June 1583, Thado Minsaw, the viceroy of Ava, sent secret embassies to Prome, Toungoo and Chiang Mai to launch a simultaneous revolt against Nanda. Minkhaung II and the other viceroys sided with Nanda. When Nanda marched to Ava in March 1584, he along with the rulers of Prome and Chiang Mai also marched to Ava. Ava turned out to be Minkhaung's last campaign. He died in June 1584. He was succeeded by his eldest son styled as Minye Thihathu II of Toungoo.

Family
His chief queen was Laygyun Mibaya, a daughter of King Bayin Htwe of Prome. They were married in 1545 at the coronation ceremony of Tabinshwehti at the Pegu Palace. The couple had five children (two sons and three daughters). They were:
 Minye Thihathu II, King of Toungoo (1597–1609)
 Thado Dhamma Yaza, Gov. of Kawliya
 Min Phyu of Toungoo, Queen of the Southern Palace of Burma (1583–96)
 Thiri Yaza Dewi, Queen of the Northern Palace of Burma (1583–99)
 Min Htwe, Queen of the Central Palace of Burma (1583–99)

He also had a daughter by a concubine.

In popular culture

Minkhaung II has been referred to as the basis for the Taungoo Mingaung nat, one of the Thirty Seven Nats in the official pantheon. Based on the nature of his death, however, Minkhaung II, who died of natural causes, may not be the basis. On the other hand, Minkhaung I (r. 1446–51) was brutally assassinated. Given that death from violent murders is one of the main criteria for being inducted into the pantheon, Minkhaung I is probably the basis for the nat.

Notes

References

Bibliography
 
 
 
 
 
 

First Toungoo Empire
1584 deaths
Year of birth unknown
1520s births